Hardinera (Philippine Spanish: jardinera), also known as the Quezon meatloaf or the Lucban meatloaf, is a Filipino meatloaf made with diced or ground pork topped with sliced hard-boiled eggs, pineapples, carrots, bell peppers, peas, tomatoes, and raisins, among others. The ingredients used are identical to the ones used in Filipino menudo; while the cooking process is similar to the Filipino embutido. It is traditionally steamed in an oval-shaped tin mold known as a llanera (or lyanera), which is also used to make leche flan. It originates from the province of Quezon in Luzon Island.

See also
Everlasting
Morcón
Embutido
 List of pork dishes

References

Philippine cuisine
Pork dishes
Pineapple dishes
Egg dishes
Steamed foods
Quezonin Cuisine